Matthews Southern Comfort (MSC) was originally a British country rock/folk rock band, formed in 1970 by former Fairport Convention singer Ian (later Iain) Matthews. The original line-up consisted of Matthews, lead guitarist Mark Griffiths (who would later become the bass player with both The Shadows and The Everly Brothers), rhythm guitarist Carl Barnwell, bass player Pete Watkins, drummer Roger Swallow and pedal steel guitarist Gordon Huntley. Watkins and Swallow, however, left the band after just a few weeks and were replaced by bass player Andy Leigh and drummer Ray Duffy.

The band was formed to allow Matthews to go on tour following the success of his first post-Fairport album released in early 1970, Matthews' Southern Comfort. They recorded two more albums that year, Second Spring and Later That Same Year, before splitting up when Matthews abruptly quit during the height of their fame, shortly after their version of the Joni Mitchell song "Woodstock" became a worldwide hit, reaching the top of the UK music charts in October 1970, their only No. 1 hit single. "Woodstock" also charted in several European countries, as well as reaching No. 5 in Canada, and No. 23 in the Billboard Top 100 in the United States.

Now based in the Netherlands after a long career as a solo artist in the United States, Matthews has twice reformed the band in recent years with mostly Dutch musicians: firstly in 2010, releasing two new albums, Kind Of New and Kind Of Live (individually and as a combined tour issue), and again in 2017, releasing two further albums, Like A Radio in 2018 and The New Mine in 2020. A new album The Woodstock Album is scheduled for release in the spring of 2023.

Matthews Southern Comfort: The original band (1970)

Debut album 
Ian Matthews had been a member of Fairport Convention between 1967 and 1969, singing vocals on the band's first two albums, alongside Judy Dyble on the self-titled Fairport Convention, and then with Sandy Denny on the widely-acclaimed What We Did on Our Holidays after she had replaced Dyble as the lead female singer in 1968.

By the time of the recording of their third album Unhalfbricking in early 1969, Fairport, under Denny's influence, had largely abandoned their original American singer-songwriter material and were moving towards what would become known as English folk rock. The genre was somewhat alien to Matthews' tastes leading to a discontent within Fairport that saw him essentially fired from the band after a meeting with producer Joe Boyd in February 1969. Matthews nevertheless continued to live in the same shared house in Brent as his former Fairport band members Richard Thompson and Simon Nicol and was paid a £20 per week retainer until he found his new path. In Fairport he had not played any instruments save the odd conga drum or Jew’s harp; to counter this 'deficiency' he set about learning to play the guitar, being taught by no less than Richard Thompson. He was still living with Thompson and Nicol at the time of the motorway crash in May 1969 that killed Fairport drummer Martin Lamble and Thompson’s then girlfriend, Jeannie Franklyn.

During the summer of 1969, after discussions with DJ John Peel (who had always championed Fairport’s music), Matthews decided that the singer-songwriter path was the direction he wanted to head in musically, and he thus recorded his debut solo album Matthews’ Southern Comfort at De Lane Lea Studios in London in November 1969. The musicians who played on it with Matthews were all stalwarts of the British folk rock scene and included his ex-Fairport colleagues Ashley Hutchings, Simon Nicol and Richard Thompson, plus Gerry Conway, the drummer from the folk rock band Fotheringay in which Sandy Denny was now the vocalist. Thompson was the original producer of the album, though Matthews himself later took over that role.

The album was released in January 1970 on the Uni record label (a subsidiary of MCA Records) under the title Matthews’ Southern Comfort. Matthews Southern Comfort (without the apostrophe) were not yet a band at that stage and Matthews was not yet ready to go solo so the title was an all embracing attempt to encompass an album title and the collective of musicians that made it. As Matthews told author Ian Clayton in one of the interviews for their co-written 2018 book Thro’ My Eyes: A Memoir, "it got me out of the dilemma of not wanting to go solo and it sounded like a band name". The album took its name from a song that Matthews liked, "Southern Comfort" by the Canadian folk duo Ian & Sylvia.

Most of the songs on the album were written by Matthews and his now managers Ken Howard and Alan Blaikley (under the assumed name Steve Barlby) who had previously written hit songs for the likes of The Honeycombs and Dave Dee, Dozy, Beaky, Mick and Tich. To all intents and purposes the ‘first’ MSC album was an Ian Matthews solo album, and the touring and recording band Matthews Southern Comfort who went on to release two more albums, Second Spring and Later That Same Year, would not be formed until later, with only pedal steel player Gordon Huntley and Matthews appearing on all three albums.

Matthews Southern Comfort: The band 

Ian Matthews was friends with musician Marc Ellington, who had guested on Fairport Convention's 1969 album Unhalfbricking, providing vocal support. Additionally, he had worked with Matthews on the Matthews’ Southern Comfort album in 1969, playing percussion. In the early part of 1970, at Ellington's suggestion, Matthews went to see a group called Harsh Reality who were about to be dropped by their record label, Philips. Mark Griffiths (lead guitar), Carl Barnwell (rhythm guitar) and Roger Swallow (drums) became the core of the band Matthews Southern Comfort and the session player Gordon Huntley, who had played pedal steel on the Matthews’ Southern Comfort album, was added. A young student called Pete Watkins, a bass player, completed the first line-up. Watkins, however, soon discovered that his studies were going to be affected and dropped out of the band, to be replaced by Andy Leigh who had just left the band Spooky Tooth. Not long after that Roger Swallow also decided he wanted to leave and he was replaced by Ray Duffy, late of the band Marmalade, who stood head and shoulders above the half dozen drummers who auditioned to be Swallow's replacement.

This then was the band that became the final version of Matthews Southern Comfort and who recorded the albums Second Spring and Later That Same Year. Their style of three-part harmonies mixed with country rock appealed to English music fans at the time and they toured the UK extensively, beginning in February 1970 with a gig at the Mothers club in Birmingham, a triple-header bill alongside Fairport Convention and Fotheringay. A live performance of the band playing at a festival in Maidstone, Kent in 1970, again alongside Fairport Convention, was captured in a Tony Palmer film narrated by John Peel and released on DVD in 2007. It was also released as a CD soundtrack in 2009.

MSC also recorded some nine radio sessions for the BBC, the best of which were eventually released on the 1994 album Scion. These radio sessions were aired regularly on the BBC during 1970 on programmes such as 'Folk On One' and 'Top Gear'. The recordings also appeared on eight editions of a series of BBC Transcription Services discs called Various - Pick Of The Pops For Your D.J.. These discs at the time were typically only made available to overseas radio stations for broadcast purposes and were not made available for sale to the general public.

"Woodstock"
Despite the general popularity of their albums, it was however a single that propelled Matthews Southern Comfort to popular music fame, their version of Joni Mitchell's "Woodstock".

Mitchell wrote "Woodstock" about the famous music festival held in upstate New York in August 1969, an event widely regarded as a pivotal moment in the history of popular music. Hers was one of three versions of the song released in 1970 and was included on her March 1970 album Ladies Of The Canyon. It was also the B-side of her single release, "Big Yellow Taxi". The second version, also released in March of that year, was by Crosby, Stills, Nash & Young who had themselves performed at the festival, their version appearing as a track on their No.1 album Déjà Vu and as a single which reached No.11 in the Billboard Top 100 charts in May 1970. Over the years it has become a staple of classic rock radio worldwide and is the best-known version in the United States. 
The third version by Matthews Southern Comfort became the best known version in the United Kingdom, and was the highest charting version of the song worldwide, reaching the top of the UK music charts in 1970.

On Sunday 4 June 1970, MSC went into the BBC’s radio studio to record a ‘live’ performance. They had three songs they wanted to record but the BBC wanted four, so they worked out an arrangement of "Woodstock", a song that Matthews particularly liked after buying Mitchell’s Ladies Of The Canyon album some weeks before. Matthews recalled in 1000 UK #1 Hits by Jon Kutner & Spencer Leigh: "I had bought Joni Mitchell's album and we had to do four songs on a BBC lunchtime show. We worked up an arrangement for “Woodstock” and the response was so good that we put it out as a single. Crosby, Stills & Nash's record had just come out and so we waited to see what happened to that first".

"Woodstock" duly became that fourth song and the session was aired on the BBC on 28 June. There was a big listener response to the song; people wanted to know where they could buy the record, which of course did not yet exist. Howard and Blaikley wanted the band to record it with a view to putting it on their forthcoming album Later That Same Year but Matthews argued against that and wanted to keep the album as he had originally intended it to be. It was thus recorded and released as a single on the Uni label on 24 July 1970 backed by a Matthews composition, "Scion", but only when it was becoming obvious that the CSNY version was not going to be a British hit.

The day after its release, on Saturday 25 July 1970, MSC appeared on the TV programme Disco 2 with DJ Tommy Vance, where they performed "Woodstock". They also performed "Woodstock" on the BBC’s Top Of The Pops on 13 August. Interest in the record was initially slow; it made a cautious entry to the UK charts at No.45 but then in September 1970 Radio One DJ Tony Blackburn made "Woodstock" his Record Of The Week and sales rocketed. "Woodstock" made it to the top of the British charts on 31 October 1970 replacing Freda Payne’s "Band Of Gold" and stayed at the top of the charts for three weeks before being replaced by Jimi Hendrix' "Voodoo Chile". It became Matthews Southern Comfort’s one and only No.1 record.

"Woodstock" also had widespread success outside the UK, charting in several European countries, as well as South Africa, New Zealand, and Australia. It was also released as a single on the Decca label in the United States and Canada, this time coupled with a track from their Second Spring album, "Ballad of Obray Ramsey", peaking at No.23 in the Billboard charts on 16 May 1971. The song also became the lead track on the US and Canadian versions of their Later That Same Year album, replacing the track "Jonah" which had been on the original UK version of the album.

Chart success and its attendant media coverage and obligations did not, however, sit at all easily with Matthews, nor did the increasing spectre of being labelled as a country rock band. He became disenchanted with the dominant sound of pedal steel guitar in the band and walked out on them during their tour to promote their third album Later That Same Year which had been released on 20 November. His discontent came to a head a week later at the soundcheck for a sell-out gig at Birmingham Town Hall on Friday 27 November where he abruptly quit there and then and returned home to London by train, leaving the band to continue that gig and one in Manchester the following day without their leader. Matters cannot have been made easier by the fact that in the Disc and Music Echo music weekly, which had hit the newsstands the day before on Thursday 26 November, Matthews had been quoted as saying that he was not denying he was about to leave the band.

The original MSC lasted basically a year - in an interview published in 1971 in Disc and Music Echo, Matthews said "In the past year, the group was formed, did two albums, got a number one single and disbanded". The remaining members of the group continued under the shortened name of Southern Comfort, releasing three albums on the Harvest label, while Matthews again picked up the threads of his career. In early 1971, he joined forces again with former Fairport colleague Richard Thompson and Andy Roberts, the trio recording two concert sessions for the BBC and then later touring the US that summer. He also released his first solo album in his own name, If You Saw Thro' My Eyes on the Vertigo label, formed Plainsong with Roberts at the end of 1971, recording the album In Search of Amelia Earhart released in October 1972 and then went on to a new career in America in 1973, recording numerous solo albums in the ensuing years.

Matthews Southern Comfort: revival (2010-2012) 
After 27 years of recording and touring in America, Matthews decided to return to Europe in 2000. Now based in Holland, he continued to record and tour, mainly as a solo artist but also with Dutch singer-songwriter Ad Vanderveen as The Iain Ad Venture and with former bandmate Andy Roberts as Plainsong Light.

In 2005, he decided to revive his Matthews Southern Comfort band after touring with Dutch pianist Mike Roelofs and New Zealand guitarist Richard Kennedy, both of whom he thought would be perfect as members of a new MSC. He also co-opted Dutch guitarist and multi-instrumentalist BJ Baartmans and American singer Terri Binion for this new project and some 15 new songs were recorded during a 10-day period at a studio in Holland. Plans for an MSC tour were made but Matthews still had misgivings about the recordings, that something felt "not quite right" and thus the planned tour and recordings were subsequently shelved.

Some five years later, on re-listening to the tapes from the recording sessions, Matthews decided that whatever misgivings he’d had were unfounded and got the band together again to get the recordings into shape. Overdubs and new vocals were recorded, some drums were added and thus, some forty years after the original band had broken up, a new Matthews Southern Comfort album Kind Of New was released in 2010.

Terri Binion, however, lived in Florida and was unavailable when it came to planning a European tour schedule to promote the new album so Matthews recruited as her replacement Dutch singer Elly Kellner who he had earlier seen play at a festival gig. The band toured Germany, Holland and the UK in 2011 and also recorded a 7-track live album, Kind Of Live, released in 2011. A combined 2CD version of the two albums was also released in 2012.

Matthews Southern Comfort: current band (2017-present) 
Having reformed his 1970s band Plainsong with Andy Roberts once again in 2015, and after touring to promote their albums Fat Lady Singing and Reinventing Richard: The Songs Of Richard Fariña, Matthews decided to revive Matthews Southern Comfort for the third time in the spring of 2017. The latest band line-up consists of Matthews on vocals and guitar, together with Dutch musicians BJ Baartmans on electric guitar and mandolin, Eric Devries on vocals and guitar, and Bart de Win on keyboards.

The band recorded 15 tracks for a new Matthews Southern Comfort album in the summer of 2017, consisting of 12 all new Matthews compositions plus three re-worked versions of songs that had been recorded by the original band in 1970. They began airing the new material on tour in October that year; the opening gig of the tour on 27 October 2017 at Music Star in Norderstedt, Germany was recorded and two video clips of the band performing old MSC songs ("Road To Ronderlin" and "Darcy Farrow") were released on YouTube to promote the upcoming album. In addition, a live concert recorded on 22 November 2017 at Bergen op Zoom in Holland was broadcast on the Dutch internet radio station, Crossroads Radio. Like A Radio was released on the MIG (Made In Germany) label on 23 February 2018 and was toured and promoted extensively across Germany, Holland and the UK during 2018 and 2019.

Following a short series of UK gigs in July 2019, the band returned to the studio and recorded a new 12-track album The New Mine. It consists of mostly new material written by Matthews, but also has Matthews Southern Comfort returning full circle to the root of the original band’s success by recording another Joni Mitchell song, "Ethiopia", from her 1985 Dog Eat Dog album. The New Mine was released worldwide on 27 March 2020. A planned eight-date tour of Germany that month to promote the album had to be postponed due to the coronavirus pandemic. A new digital single "Hey Superman", written by Matthews about the pandemic and with all four musicians recording their individual parts in isolation, was also released on 23 April 2020.

In July 2022, the band began recording a new Matthews Southern Comfort album at Wild Verband studio in Boxmeer, The Netherlands. The Woodstock Album features MSC’s interpretations of songs that were played by various different artists at the Woodstock Festival in August 1969. A first single from the album, their cover of the Beatles’ song ‘With A Little Help From My Friends‘ which was performed by Joe Cocker at Woodstock, was released via Spotify on 7 October 2022. Further digital singles, ‘I Feel Like I’m Fixing To Die Rag’ and ‘Spinning Wheel’, were released in January and March 2023 respectively. The 15-track album is set to be released on the Must Have Music label in April 2023.

Filmography
 Tony Palmer’s Film Of Fairport Convention and Matthews Southern Comfort, directed by Tony Palmer, featuring both bands appearances at the Maidstone Fiesta in 1970.
Originally released as a VHS video by MusicFolk/Weintraub, re-released on DVD by Voiceprint Records in 2007, soundtrack CD issued by Voiceprint as Live In Maidstone 1970 in 2009.

Discography
 Matthews' Southern Comfort (1969) UK Uni / US Decca (first solo album)
 Second Spring (1970) UK Uni / US Decca
 Later That Same Year (1970) UK Uni / US Decca / US Reissue Pickwick
 One, Two, Three…Too Good !  (1970 German vinyl release) Teldec / MCA (2LP best of compilation) 
 The Best Of Matthews Southern Comfort (1971 Japanese vinyl release) Victor Co. of Japan / MCA
 Best Of Matthews Southern Comfort (1974 vinyl; 1989 CD) MCA Records
 Ian Matthews’ Best In Early 70s (1979 Japanese vinyl release) Victor Musical Industries / MCA 
 Matthews Southern Comfort Meet Southern Comfort (1987 vinyl compilation) See For Miles
 Scion (1994) UK Band Of Joy / US Dutch East India Trading (collection of outtakes and BBC recordings)
 The Essential Collection (1997) Half Moon (retrospective of 1970s recordings)
 Matthews’ Southern Comfort / Second Spring (1996) BGO Records
 Later That Same Year (2008 CD) BGO Records (original album remaster + 4 bonus tracks)
 Fairport Convention & Matthews Southern Comfort - Live In Maidstone 1970 (2009) Voiceprint 
 Kind Of New (2010) Brilliant / Genepool 
 Kind Of Live (2011) Perfect Pitch
 Kind Of New / Kind of Live (2012) 2CD Esoteric / Cherry Red
 Matthews Southern Comfort: A Simple History Vol.1 (2017) MK2 Records (2017 tour album) 
 Like A Radio (2018) MIG
 Bits And Pieces (2018) MIG (4-track EP including an alternative mix of "Woodstock")
 The New Mine (2020) MIG
 Hey Superman (2020) (Digital single)
 With A Little Help From My Friends (2022) (Digital single)
 The Woodstock Album (2022) Must Have Music (due for release 21 April 2023)

References

External links
 Iain Matthews official web site

Further reading

 Ian Clayton: In Search Of Plainsong, Route Publishing, 2022; 
 Iain Matthews with Ian Clayton: Thro' My Eyes: A Memoir, Route Publishing, 2018; 
 Clinton Heylin: What We Did Instead Of Holidays: A History Of Fairport Convention And Its Extended Folk-Rock Family. Route Publishing, 2018; 
 Mick Houghton: I've Always Kept A Unicorn – The Biography of Sandy Denny. Faber & Faber, 2016; 
 Joe Boyd: White Bicycles – Making Music In The 1960s. Serpent's Tail, 2005; 
 Patrick Humphries: Meet On The Ledge: A History Of Fairport Convention. Eel Pie Publishing Ltd., 1982; 

British country rock musical groups